Always Be True and Faithful is a 1927 German silent film directed by Reinhold Schünzel and starring Reinhold Schünzel, Rosa Valetti and Julius E. Herrmann.

The film's sets were designed by the art directors Emil Hasler and Oscar Friedrich Werndorff.

Cast
 Reinhold Schünzel as Orje Duff
 Rosa Valetti as Fedora Bratfisch, Karussellbesitzerin
 Julius E. Herrmann as Anton Rabach, Inhaber eines Modellhauses
 Lydia Potechina as Friderike Rabach, Antons Frau
 Ernst Hofmann as Kasimir Rabach, beider Sohn
 Toni Philippi as Laetitia Della Casa
 Sig Arno as Poldi Meindl
 Margot Landa as Christine Bleibtreu
 Yvette Darnys as Yvette, Revuestar
 Kurt Gerron as Yvettes Mann
 Paul Westermeier as Karl, Hausdiener bei Rabach
 Hans Albers
 Ferdinand Bonn
 Gaston Briese

References

Bibliography

External links

1927 films
Films of the Weimar Republic
German silent feature films
German black-and-white films
Films directed by Reinhold Schünzel
UFA GmbH films